
Gmina Potok Wielki is a rural gmina (administrative district) in Janów Lubelski County, Lublin Voivodeship, in eastern Poland.

Villages
Gmina Potok Wielki contains the villages and settlements of Dąbrowica, Dąbrówka, Kolonia Potok Wielki, Maliniec, Osinki, Osówek, Popielarnia, Potoczek, Potok Wielki, Potok Wielki Drugi, Potok-Stany, Potok-Stany Kolonia, Radwanówka, Stany Nowe, Stawki, Wola Potocka and Zarajec Potocki.

Neighbouring gminas
Gmina Potok Wielki is bordered by the gminas of Modliborzyce, Pysznica, Szastarka, Trzydnik Duży and Zaklików.

References

Polish official population figures 2006

Potok Wielki
Janów Lubelski County